The Kirby Building, historically known as the Busch Building, is a 17-story skyscraper in the Main Street District of Downtown Dallas. The structure was completed in 1913 by beer magnate Adolphus Busch to accompany his nearby Hotel Adolphus. The building became vacant with many older buildings during the economic downturn of the 1980s. While the building was symbolic of downtown's crash in the 1980s, it also served as a symbol of the start of the resurrection as it became the first high-rise to be converted from office use to residential apartments. The structure is a Dallas Landmark and listed on the National Register of Historic Places.

See also

National Register of Historic Places listings in Dallas County, Texas
Recorded Texas Historic Landmarks in Dallas County
List of Dallas Landmarks

References

External links

Residential skyscrapers in Dallas
Buildings and structures completed in 1913
Recorded Texas Historic Landmarks
National Register of Historic Places in Dallas
Department stores on the National Register of Historic Places
1913 establishments in Texas
Commercial buildings on the National Register of Historic Places in Texas